Lucy Kathleen Nethsingha (born 6 February 1973) is a British Liberal Democrat politician, a member of Cambridgeshire County Council since 2009. She was a Member of the European Parliament (MEP) for the East of England from 2019 until the United Kingdom's withdrawal from the EU in 2020. She was chair of the Parliament's Committee on Legal Affairs (JURI).

Early life
She attended the comprehensive Penair School, in Truro, to the age of 16. She attended the sixth form of the independent Truro School, then gained a BSc degree in Psychology from the University of Southampton.

Politics 
Nethsingha served as a Liberal Democrat councillor on Gloucester City Council from 2004 to 2008. After moving to Cambridgeshire, Nethsingha was elected for the Newnham division on Cambridgeshire County Council as a Liberal Democrat at the 2009 election, and has been leader of the Liberal Democrat Group on the council since 2015 (she had previously been deputy leader since 2011). Since 2016, she has also represented the Newnham ward on Cambridge City Council.

She unsuccessfully contested the North East Cambridgeshire parliamentary constituency in the 2015 general election, finishing in fourth place out of five candidates with 2,314 votes (4.5%). In the snap general election held two years later, she contested South East Cambridgeshire and finished last out of three candidates with 11,958 votes (19.0%).

Nethsingha became a Member of the European Parliament in the 2019 elections, until 2020 when the United Kingdom left the EU.

After the 2021 Cambridgeshire County Council election she became leader of the council after agreeing a deal with the Labour and Independent groups.

Personal life 
Nethsingha grew up in Cornwall, which she states made her aware of the importance of caring for the environment. She is a teacher by profession and holds a master's degree from the University of Cambridge. 

She is married and has three children. Her husband, Andrew Nethsingha, has been Organist and Master of the Choristers at Westminster Abbey since 2023.

References

1973 births
Living people
Alumni of the University of Southampton
MEPs for England 2019–2020
Liberal Democrats (UK) MEPs
21st-century women MEPs for England
Liberal Democrats (UK) councillors
Liberal Democrats (UK) parliamentary candidates
Members of Cambridgeshire County Council
Leaders of local authorities of England
People from Truro
People educated at Truro School
Women councillors in England